is a Japanese football player. He plays for Thespakusatsu Gunma.

Career
Toshiya Tanaka joined J1 League club Kashima Antlers in 2016. June 5, he debuted in J.League Cup (v Omiya Ardija).

Tanaka signed with Thespakusatsu Gunma for the 2019 season.

Club statistics
Updated to 23 February 2018.

1Includes Japanese Super Cup, J. League Championship and FIFA Club World Cup.

References

External links

Profile at Kashima Antlers

1997 births
Living people
Association football people from Gunma Prefecture
Japanese footballers
J1 League players
J2 League players
J3 League players
Kashima Antlers players
Thespakusatsu Gunma players
Association football midfielders